Summer Playhouse is a 30-minute CBS television anthology series.  It was a summer replacement series made up of unsold pilots for projected regular series, airing sporadically from 1964 to 1967. It was produced by Don Fedderson, and among its notable stars were Fred MacMurray, Steve Allen, Jimmy Durante, and Jane Wyman. Nelson Case was the announcer.

References

External links

Summer Playhouse at CVTA with list of episodes

1964 American television series debuts
1967 American television series endings
1960s American anthology television series
CBS original programming